Kasap is a surname, a Turkish-language  variant of Qasab. Notable people with the surname include:

Ali Fazıl Kasap, Turkish medical doctor, senator and academician
Karolj Kasap, wrestler
Mike Kasap,  American football player 
Safa Kasap, Canadian engineer
Teodor Kasap, Turkish name of Theodoros Kasapis (1835–1897), Ottoman Greek newspaper editor and educator

See also

Turkish-language surnames